Calosoma tepidum is a species of ground beetle in the subfamily Carabinae. It was described by John Lawrence LeConte in 1851.

References

tepidum
Beetles described in 1851